Welcome Home is a 1925 American silent comedy-drama film directed by James Cruze and starring Lois Wilson and Warner Baxter.  It was produced by Famous Players-Lasky and distributed by Paramount Pictures. The film is based on the 1924 Broadway play Minick by Edna Ferber and George S. Kaufman.

Plot
As described in a film magazine review, Old Man Prouty goes to live with his son. There he becomes a general annoyance, prying into things unwittingly and spoiling plans for everyone. He finds other cronies at the Old Men's Home and, after learning that his son is to choose between him and the young wife, he goes to live at the Home.

Cast

Reception
In a 1925 review for The New York Times, Mordaunt Hall referred to the play Minick and wrote, "while this narrative in shadow form still possesses an inevitable undertone of sympathy, it misses fire in some important periods through an obvious fondness for exaggeration and a tendency to ignore opportunities for suspense or subtlety, which is surprising as this picture was directed by the able and versatile James Cruze." A 1925 review for Time Magazine noted "Significant character study is the hardest thing to find in the cinema," and stated "The subtleties of old age in the middle classes escaped even the directorial discernment of James Cruze."

Preservation
A print of Welcome Home is preserved in the Library of Congress collection.

References

External links

Still at www.silentfilmstillarchive.com
Still with Lois Wilson at worthopedia

1925 films
American silent feature films
Films directed by James Cruze
American films based on plays
Famous Players-Lasky films
Paramount Pictures films
1925 comedy-drama films
1920s English-language films
American black-and-white films
Films based on works by Edna Ferber
1920s American films
Silent American comedy-drama films
Surviving American silent films